The men's 1500 metre freestyle event at the 2010 Asian Games took place on 18 November 2010 at Guangzhou Aoti Aquatics Centre.

There were 13 competitors from 11 countries who took part in this event. 8 swimmers with the fast qualifying time were in the fast heat, the others were in the slow heat. The final ranking was arranged by the times from both heats.

Sun Yang from China won the gold medal in a new Asian record of 14 minutes 35.43 seconds. It was the second all-time behind only Grant Hackett's world record of 14:34.56 from the 2001 World Championships, the gap between the world record is less than one second.

Schedule
All times are China Standard Time (UTC+08:00)

Records

Results

References

 16th Asian Games Results

External links 
 Men's 1500m Freestyle Ev.No.37 Slow Heat Official Website
 Men's 1500m Freestyle Ev.No.37 Fast Heat Official Website

Swimming at the 2010 Asian Games